Water Serpents II, also referred to as Wasserschlangen II, is an oil painting made by Gustav Klimt in 1907. It is the follow-up painting to the earlier painting Water Serpents I. Like the first painting, Water Serpents II deals with the sensuality of women's bodies and same-sex relationships. The painting has a rich history. During World War II, it was stolen by the Nazis, and more recently, it has been the center of a controversy surrounding its record 2013 sale. As of December 2019, it is the 6th most expensive painting in the world and the most expensive work by Klimt to sell.

Origins 

The painting is an oil on canvas. It was started by Klimt in 1904 and finished in either 1906 or 1907. It was originally commissioned for and owned by Jenny Steiner, the daughter of a Viennese industrialist. The painting was the last in a series of works, which include Moving Water (1898), Medicine (1901), Goldfish (1902), and Water Serpents I (1904), that all had water nymphs as the subjects of the painting.

Subject and meaning 
The painting features a group of four water nymphs, portrayed in lustful bliss. Two are seen in the foreground in full nudity; the other two can be found in the top right corner of the piece, and only their heads are visible. The painting can be seen as a non-controversial portrayal of mythical figures, which had been common in art for centuries. But it has also been interpreted as a depiction of a lesbian orgy. According to this interpretation, since same-sex relationships were not acceptable at the time, Klimt disguised the women as mythical figures. This is supported by the fact that the main character’s pubic hair is showing, and she is glaring sensually at the viewer. This glare is reminiscent of the way the subject glares at the viewer in the painting Olympia by Manet. This painting, and its lesbian subjects, is seen as a precursor to later Klimt paintings such as Women Friends (1917), which displayed lesbian relationships more openly.

History

World War II 
The painting's owner, Jenny Steiner, was Jewish, and she was forced to flee Vienna to Portugal in 1938 under threat from the Nazis. Following Steiner's escape, the painting, like many others owned by Jews, was confiscated by the Nazis. It was given to a Nazi filmmaker named Gustav Ucicky. Ucicky is actually rumored to be one of Klimt's many illegitimate children.

Post war 
Following the end of the war, Ucicky retained possession of the painting, and it hung on a wall in his apartment in Vienna. In 1961, Ucicky died, and he left the painting to his wife, Ursula. This whole time, the painting was considered lost.

21st-Century 
In 2012, Ursula Ucicky put the painting up for sale with Sotheby’s Auction House acting as the broker. Because the painting was still considered stolen art, Ursula had to come to an agreement with the heirs of Jenny Steiner, the rightful owner of the painting, in order to obtain an export license for the painting. The agreement, which was mediated by the Israelitische Kultusgemeinde Wien, or Vienesse Jewish Community, stipulated that the proceeds would be split 50/50 between Ursula and the heirs. That same year, the painting was sold to art broker Yves Bouvier for $112 million, which meant each party received around $56 million. The heirs of Jenny Steiner used their portion of the proceeds to found the New Klimt Foundation.

The Bouvier Affair 

In 2013 Yves Bouvier sold the painting to the Russian billionaire Dmitry Rybolovlev, one of the largest private art collectors in the world. As he did to many other wealthy collectors, Bouvier tricked Rybololev. Bouvier didn't tell Rybolovlev that he was actually the owner of the painting and had paid $112 million for it. Instead, Bouvier made it seem like the painting was still owned by a third party and convinced Rybolovlev that the painting was worth much more than $112 million. In the end, Rybolovlev paid $183.3 million for the painting, plus an additional $3.7 million administrative fee. This means that Bouvier made a profit of $75 million by tricking Rybolovlev. Eventually, the deceit was uncovered. Rybolovlev, along with Bouvier's many other victims, has brought charges and lawsuits against Bouvier. As of 2019, the litigation was still ongoing.

Present day 
In 2015, the painting was once again sold by Rybolovlev. This time, it was sold for $170 million to an undisclosed buyer. The painting is rumored to be in the private collection of an unnamed Qatari Princess or Asian buyer. As of October 2022, the painting is exhibited at the Van Gogh Museum in Amsterdam as part of the "Golden Boy - Gustav Klimt" exhibition.

References 

Paintings by Gustav Klimt
1907 paintings
Bathing in art
Painting controversies
Nude art
Nazi-looted art